The Kaogma Festival marks the foundation day (May 27, 1569) of Camarines Sur in the Philippines. Former Governor Luis R Villafuerte started this festival; he sent researchers, including Prof. Danny Gerona, to Spain to determine the foundation day of Camarines Sur. The researchers found that the birth date of the province is May 27, 1589. It originated in Naga City, and for several years, it was also held there. It was only transferred to Pili when Luis Raymund Villafuerte became governor in 2004. The word "kaogma" is derived from the Bicolano word meaning “happy.”  

Kaogma Festival is a week-long pageant of colorful activities. The Kaogma Festival title has been modified to "Kaogma Mardi Gras: the World's Hottest Festival". Kaogma translates to "a good time" in the local dialect.

The festival was first celebrated on May 15, 1989. But before, it was just a one-day celebration. However, it was extended into three days in 1999 by Former Governor Luis R Villafuerte. Through the efforts of the Villafuertes in Camarines Sur, Kaogma Festival became famous, and it also became the biggest festival in Camarines Sur. 

Its May 2005 celebration featured an array of events such as the "Hot Banda Jam", "Hot Buys", Buruntolan, "Hot Kids Starquest", the "Hot New Singing Star Search", "Miss Camarines Sur 2005", "Camarines Sur bids for Guinness World Record", "Silliest Plaza Contest", a thanksgiving Mass, "Hot Grand Parade", and a "Hot Party". That was the first time when all main activities of the Kaogma Festival were held within the Provincial Capitol Complex in Cadlan, Pili, Camarines Sur.

The festival features numerous cultural activities such as expositions, sports events, beauty pageant, singing competition, processional grand parade and street dance competitions. This series of events are mounted to create an excellent opportunity and platform for Camsur talent, craftsmanship and creativity. Since 2017, the free festival is now celebrated for 10 days every last week of May, held at Pili Freedom Sports Complex, featuring live bands, celebrity guesting concerts and carnival rides.

References

External links
 / Camarines Sur Official Website

Cultural festivals in the Philippines
Culture of Camarines Sur
Tourist attractions in Camarines Sur
Christian festivals in the Philippines